Tonto School District 33  is a school district in Gila County, Arizona.

References

External links
 

School districts in Gila County, Arizona